The Benjamin & Marian Schuster Performing Arts Center (Schuster Center) is located in Dayton, Ohio and was built in 2003 to serve as Dayton's principal center of the lively arts. It is owned and operated by the Dayton Live and occupies the former site of Rike's department store. The Center opened an additional venue to house Dayton Live's larger touring Broadway productions and presentations. The Dayton Philharmonic, the Dayton Opera, and the Dayton Ballet rent the building for their performances. The Schuster Center and the Metropolitan Arts Center, occupying the former Metropolitan department store building next to the Victoria Theatre, stage a variety of performances of any size and form the basis of the performing arts district in downtown Dayton.

The Schuster Center comprises restaurants, a large Wintergarden, a 15-story office and residential tower, and a blackbox theater and rehearsal space.

Architect César Pelli, in designing the center's 2,300 seat Mead Theatre, included a fiber-optically illuminated domed ceiling depicting the Dayton sky as it appeared on the eve of the Wright Brothers’ first flight - December 16, 1903. The Wintergarden houses exotic palm trees and a café with a large glass and steel wall that looks out onto downtown Dayton.

Since its opening, the Schuster Center has hosted a number of top musical shows, including Hamilton, The Lion King, Les Misérables, Wicked, Jersey Boys, Joseph and the Amazing Technicolor Dreamcoat and Beauty and the Beast.

References

External links
 Schuster Center official website
 The Dayton Philharmonic Orchestra
 The Dayton Ballet
 Victoria Theatre
 The Dayton Performing Arts Alliance

Concert halls in Ohio
Theatres in Dayton, Ohio
Performing arts centers in Ohio
Tourist attractions in Dayton, Ohio
César Pelli buildings
2003 establishments in Ohio
Skyscraper office buildings in Dayton, Ohio
Residential skyscrapers in Ohio